Dungeon Explorer may refer to:

Dungeon Explorer (1989 video game), developed by Atlus
Dungeon Explorer (1995 video game), developed by Hudson Soft and Westone
Dungeon Explorer II, developed by Hudson Soft
Dungeon Explorer: Warriors of Ancient Arts, developed by Hudson Soft